Soeng Hyang Soen Sa Nim (성향선사, born April 15, 1948) is a Zen Master and the Guiding Teacher of the international Kwan Um School of Zen, and successor to the late Seung Sahn Soen Sa Nim.

Biography
Born Barbara Trexler (later Barbara Rhodes through marriage to Lincoln Rhodes, also a Ji Do Poep Sa Nim in the order), her father was a Navy officer, and her family moved often. As a teenager in the 1960s, she traveled to California to participate in the counter cultural flowering around San Francisco, and briefly visited Tassajara Zen Monastery, though she did not practice there. She later moved back to Rhode Island, where she met Seung Sahn in 1972, who became her teacher. She was a founding member of the Providence Zen Center, now located in Cumberland, Rhode Island. Soeng Hyang received inka from Seung Sahn Soen Sa Nim in 1977, and Dharma transmission in 1992.

Personal life
She has two daughters, one adopted. She has been in a same-sex relationship for many years.

Background
Seong Hyang is a registered nurse and hospice caregiver.

See also
Buddhism in the United States
Buddhism and sexual orientation
Timeline of Zen Buddhism in the United States

References

External links
Zen Master Soeng Hyang - Kwan Um School of Zen

1948 births
Living people
American nurses
American women nurses
American Zen Buddhists
Bisexual women
Female Buddhist spiritual teachers
Chogye Buddhists
Kwan Um School of Zen
Clergy from Providence, Rhode Island
Seon Buddhists
Zen Buddhist spiritual teachers
LGBT Buddhists
21st-century American women